Bar Sport is a 2011 comedy film written and directed by Massimo Martelli and starring Claudio Bisio. It is based on a novel with the same name written by Stefano Benni.

Plot
The film, set in the mid-seventies, tells episodes of daily life that involve regulars and patrons of a modest bar in the Bolognese province.

From a trip out of town to have lunch in a cramped farmhouse recommended by one of the customers, to unfortunate trips to follow Bologna, to the tales of the deeds of unlikely and surreal sports champions, to then conclude with the classic Christmas raffle organized by the manager: a to frame all this there is always the Bar Sport.

Cast 
 Claudio Bisio as Eros 
 Giuseppe Battiston as Onassis 
 Antonio Catania as  Muzzi
  Bob Messini as  Cocosecco
 Angela Finocchiaro as Old Lady
 Lunetta Savino as Old Lady
 Antonio Cornacchione as  Bovinelli 
 Teo Teocoli as  Renzo 
  Stefano Bicocchi as Buzzi 
 Aura Rolenzetti as  Clara
 Gianluca Impastato as  Pinotti
 Alessandro Sampaoli as  Poluzzi
 Claudio Amendola as Client
 Giorgio Comaschi as Client

See also 
 List of Italian films of 2011

References

External links 

2011 comedy films
2011 films
Italian comedy films
2010s Italian-language films
2010s Italian films